Scripta Theologica is a Spanish triannual academic journal of theology established in 1969 and published by the School of Theology of the University of Navarra. The editor-in-chief is César Izquierdo.

Abstracting and indexing 
Scripta Theologica is abstracted and indexed in:

External links 
 

University of Navarra
Religious studies journals
Publications established in 1969
Spanish-language journals
Triannual journals